The Carl Bradtke Tenement is a historical habitation building located at 93 Gdańska Street, in Bydgoszcz, Poland It is registered on the Kuyavian-Pomeranian Voivodeship Heritage list.

Location 
The building stands on the eastern side of Gdańska Street between Świętojańska street and Chocimska street.

It stands close to remarkable tenements in the same street:
 Villa Carl Grosse at 84;
 Otto Riedl Tenement at 85;
 Villa Hugo Hecht at 88/90;
 Tenement at 91 Gdanska street;
 Hugo Hecht tenement at 92/94.

History
The house was built in 1895-1896, on a design by architect Joseph Święcicki for a master stonecutter Carl Bradtke. Carl Bradtke worked also with Fritz Weidner for the erection of  a nearby building at Nr.91.

The house, from the beginning, had been thought as a rental building as well as a trading one with two wings merging at the rear. The initials of the first owner ("CB") appear in a cartouche of an upper pediment.

The initial address of the house was 53 Danzigerstrasse.

At the beginning of the 20th century, the tenement housed a bicycles dealer, company Patria, run by Erich Krahn, .

In the 1920s a patisserie owned by Emil Kobielski had been operating in the building.

Features
The building has a richly decorated facade with two small side gables, in which stands a gargoyle on a background of ostrich feathers. The architect created a functional complex of buildings centered around a rectangular courtyard enclosed at the back. A hallway allows to get the residential house located at the back of the garden.

The front building follows the Historicism style with references to Neo-Baroque and Rococo.
In the same area, Józef Święcicki also realized other edifices:
 Hotel "Pod Orlem" at 14 Gdańska street;
 Oskar Ewald Tenement at 30 Gdańska street;
 Józef Święcicki tenement at 63 Gdańska street;
 Tenement at 86 Gdańska street;
 Hugo Hecht tenement at Gdańska street Nr.92/94;
 Tenement at 1 Plac Wolności.

The building has been put on the Kuyavian-Pomeranian Voivodeship Heritage List Nr.601318 Reg.A/1126/1-4, on June 5, 1993.

Gallery

See also

 Bydgoszcz
 Gdanska Street in Bydgoszcz
 Józef Święcicki
 Fritz Weidner

References

Bibliography 
 

Cultural heritage monuments in Bydgoszcz
Buildings and structures on Gdańska Street, Bydgoszcz
Buildings by Józef Święcicki
Residential buildings completed in 1896